Platform is a community shopping center in Culver City, on the Westside of Los Angeles. It has been referred to as a boutique retail center or design quarter, and houses boutiques, fitness studios, offices and restaurants in a repurposed industrial building. Tenants are required to provide experiences that are unique to Platform, which has helped the mall succeed. For example, Artist Jen Stark painted an 80-foot-high mural on the side of the building. Other elements include brightly colored tables and chairs and a curated music playlist featuring artists such as Grimes and Glass Animals.

The center won the annual LA Architectural Awards in 2017.

References

External links

Shopping malls on the Westside, Los Angeles
Culver City, California
Adaptive reuse of industrial structures in Greater Los Angeles
Community shopping centers